Polydactylus is a genus of threadfin that mainly are native to the Indian, Atlantic and Pacific Oceans, especially in coastal or brackish waters (such as mangrove or estuaries). Some may even enter rivers and a single, P. macrophthalmus, is a freshwater fish from rivers in Borneo.

Species
There are currently 21 species in the genus:

Polydactylus approximans (Lay & Bennett, 1839) (Blue bobo)
Polydactylus bifurcus Motomura, Kimura & Iwatsuki, 2001 (Slender fivefinger threadfin)
Polydactylus longipes Motomura, Okamoto & Iwatsuki, 2001 (Long-limb threadfin)
Polydactylus luparensis Lim, Motomura & Gambang, 2010 (Sarawak giant threadfin)
Polydactylus macrochir (Günther, 1867) (King threadfin)
Polydactylus macrophthalmus (Bleeker, 1858) (River threadfin)
Polydactylus malagasyensis Motomura & Iwatsuki, 2001 (African blackspot threadfin)
Polydactylus microstomus (Bleeker, 1851) (Smallmouth threadfin)
Polydactylus mullani (Hora, 1926) (Arabian blackspot threadfin)
Polydactylus multiradiatus (Günther, 1860) (Australian threadfin)
Polydactylus nigripinnis Munro, 1964 (Blackfin threadfin)
Polydactylus octonemus (Girard, 1858) (Atlantic threadfin)
Polydactylus oligodon (Günther, 1860) (Littlescale threadfin)
Polydactylus opercularis Seale & Bean, 1907 (Yellow bobo)
Polydactylus persicus Motomura & Iwatsuki, 2001 (Persian blackspot threadfin)
Polydactylus plebeius (Broussonet, 1782) (Striped threadfin)
Polydactylus quadrifilis (Cuvier, 1829) (Giant African threadfin)
Polydactylus sexfilis (Valenciennes, 1831) (Sixfinger threadfin)
Polydactylus sextarius (Bloch & Schneider, 1801) (Blackspot threadfin)
Polydactylus siamensis Motomura, Iwatsuki & Yoshino, 2001 (Largemouth striped threadfin)
Polydactylus virginicus (Linnaeus, 1758) (Barbu)

References

 
Polynemidae